The Curciu is a right tributary of the river Târnava Mare in Romania. It flows into the Târnava Mare in Dârlos.

References

Rivers of Romania
Rivers of Sibiu County